The gamo 610 is an air rifle made by Spanish air gun manufacturer Gamo. The gun was initially released in 2008.

Description
The rifle is available in .177 (4.5mm) and in .22 (5.5mm) calibre. It is loaded by a break-action system and the pellet is placed into the breach.

The rifle has an accurate range up to 50 yards but will still remain powerful up to 80 yards. The gun has a beechwood stock with stock checkering and a ventilated butt pad.

The rifle has a safety catch located in the trigger guard and is in safe mode when it is locked back and in fire mode when locked forward.

The .22 (5.5mm) version has a muzzle velocity of 540 f/s (165 m/s); the .177 (4.5mm) has a muzzle velocity of 750 f/s (230~240 m/s). The gun has fibre optic sights, with an adjustable rear sight and a grooved cylinder for optics.

The gun is rated as 10joule power.

Rifles of Spain